The Bois de Sioux River drains Lake Traverse, the southernmost body of water in the Hudson Bay watershed of  North America. It is a tributary of the Red River of the North and defines part of the western border of the U.S. state of Minnesota, and the eastern borders of North Dakota and South Dakota. It is about 41 miles (66 km) in length.

Bois de Sioux is a name derived from French meaning "Woods of the Sioux".

Course
The river flows northward from a Corps of Engineers dam at the north end of Lake Traverse and shortly enters Mud Lake. Downstream of Mud Lake it is a small stream, and its flow has been channelized and straightened in some places so that the watercourse diverges slightly from the historic state boundary. It passes the town of White Rock, South Dakota before joining the Otter Tail River to form the Red River of the North at Wahpeton, North Dakota, and Breckenridge, Minnesota.

Tributaries
The two largest tributaries of the Bois de Sioux are the Mustinka River, which flows into Lake Traverse, and the Rabbit River south of Breckenridge; both of these enter from Minnesota.

See also
 List of rivers of Minnesota
 List of rivers of North Dakota
 List of rivers of South Dakota
 List of river borders of U.S. states

References

 Waters, Thomas F. (1977).  The Streams and Rivers of Minnesota.  Minneapolis: University of Minnesota Press.  .

Rivers of Minnesota
Rivers of North Dakota
Rivers of South Dakota
Bodies of water of Richland County, North Dakota
Rivers of Roberts County, South Dakota
Rivers of Traverse County, Minnesota
Rivers of Wilkin County, Minnesota
Borders of South Dakota
Borders of North Dakota
Borders of Minnesota
Tributaries of the Red River of the North